Gary Porter (born 22 July 1996) is a South African rugby union player for the  in the United Rugby Championship. His regular position is lock.

Porter was a member of the Ikey Tigers side that was defeated in the final of the 2021 Varsity Cup. He joined the  straight out of school, making one appearance in the 2018 Rugby Challenge. In 2021, he joined , making two appearances for the side in the RFU Championship. He was released by Ealing at the end of the season. In August 2022, it was confirmed he had joined the  ahead of the 2022–23 United Rugby Championship.

References

South African rugby union players
Living people
Rugby union locks
Western Province (rugby union) players
Ealing Trailfinders Rugby Club players
Stormers players
1996 births